The 2022 Supercopa de Chile (known as the Supercopa Easy 2022 for sponsorship purposes) was the tenth edition of the Supercopa de Chile, championship organised by the Asociación Nacional de Fútbol Profesional (ANFP). The match was played by the 2021 Chilean Primera División champions Universidad Católica and the 2021 Copa Chile champions Colo-Colo on 23 January 2022 at Estadio Ester Roa in Concepción.

Colo-Colo defeated Universidad Católica by a 2–0 score to win their third Supercopa title.

Teams
The two teams that contested the Supercopa were Universidad Católica, who qualified as 2021 Primera División champions and Colo-Colo, who qualified for the match as 2021 Copa Chile champions, defeating Everton in the final by a 2–0 score.

Details

References

S
S
S